Harold Irving Johnston (March 9, 1892 – August 28, 1949) was a soldier in the United States Army who received the Medal of Honor for his actions during World War I.

Biography
Johnston was born in Kendall, Kansas on March 9, 1892, and died August 28, 1949. He is buried in Fairmount Cemetery, Denver, Colorado.

Medal of Honor citation
Rank and organization: Sergeant (then Private First Class), U.S. Army, Company A, 356th Infantry, 89th Division. Place and date: Near Pouilly, France, 9 November 1918. Entered service at: Chicago, Ill. Birth: Kendell, Kans. C O. No.: 20, W.D., 1919.

Citation:

When information was desired as to the enemy's position on the opposite side of the Meuse River, Sgt. Johnston, with another soldier, volunteered without hesitation and swam the river to reconnoiter the exact location of the enemy. He succeeded in reaching the opposite bank, despite the evident determination of the enemy to prevent a crossing. Having obtained his information, he again entered the water for his return. This was accomplished after a severe struggle which so exhausted him that he had to be assisted from the water, after which he rendered his report of the exploit.

See also

List of Medal of Honor recipients
List of Medal of Honor recipients for World War I

References

External links

United States Army Medal of Honor recipients
United States Army non-commissioned officers
United States Army personnel of World War I
People from Hamilton County, Kansas
1892 births
1949 deaths
United States Army Air Forces officers
World War I recipients of the Medal of Honor
Military personnel from Kansas
Burials at Fairmount Cemetery (Denver, Colorado)